This is a list of films and television series in which the Israeli kibbutz is prominently featured.

Feature films
A Beautiful Valley (Israel, 2011)
An Intimate Story (Israel, 1981)
Atalia (Israel, 1984)
Boy Meets Girl (Israel, 1982)
The Galilee Eskimos (Israel, 2006)
Goodbye, New York (Israel/US, 1985)
Life According to Agfa (Israel, 1992)
No Names on the Doors (Israel, 1997)
No Longer 17 (Israel, 2003)
Noa at 17 (Israel, 1982)
Not Quite Paradise (UK, 1985)
Operation Grandma (Israel, 1999)
Sallah Shabati (Israel, 1964)
Stalin's Disciples (Israel, 1986)
Sweet Mud (Israel, 2006)
Three Days and a Child (Israel, 1967)
Unsettled Land (Israel, 1987)
The Valley Train (Israel, 1989)
Walk on Water (Israel, 2004)

Documentaries
Children of the Sun (Israel, 2007)
Degania: The First Kibbutz Fights Its Last Battle (Israel, 2008)
Inventing Our Life: The Kibbutz Experiment (US/Israel, 2010)
Keeping the Kibbutz (US/Israel, 2010)
Kibbutz (Israel, 2005)

Television
Barefoot (Israel, 2011)

References

Kibbutz
Kibbutz